The International Journal of Plasticity is a monthly peer-reviewed scientific journal that covers research that relates to micro and macro plastic deformation and fracture for isotropic and anisotropic materials.The journal is published by Elsevier and the editors-in-chief is Akhtar S. Khan (University of Maryland, Baltimore County).

Abstracting and indexing
The journal is abstracted and indexed in:

According to the Journal Citation Reports, the journal has a 2021 impact factor of 8.5.

See also
Fracture mechanics
Solid mechanics

References

External links

Materials science journals
Elsevier academic journals
Monthly journals
English-language journals
Publications established in 1985